Ekko av Ibsen is a series of eight short films that were shown on NRK in autumn 2006. Norwegian Film Fund and NRK arranged in 2004 a script-writing conference that were based on texts by Henrik Ibsen. In 2004, 16 of 250 submitted projects were given kr 20,000 to further develop their projects. In 2005, eight 28-minute films were chosen; six were awarded kr 1,500,000 from the Norwegian Film Fund and the others were financed and produced by NRK.

Films

References

NRK original programming
Films directed by Marius Holst